The Cabinet of Grenada is appointed by the Prime Minister of Grenada.

Ministers 
The current ministers have been serving since 1 July 2022:

 Dickon Thomas Mitchell – Prime Minister and Minister of Finance, National Security, Home Affairs and Public Administration, Information and Disaster Management.
 Claudette Joseph – Attorney General and Minister of Legal Affairs, Labour and Consumer Affairs
 Joseph Andall – Minister of Foreign Affairs, Trade and Export Development
 Teven Andrews – Minister of Carriacou, Petite Martinique and Local Government
 Dennis Cornwall – Minister of Infrastructure and Physical Development, Civil Aviation and Transportation
 Kerryne Zennelle James – Minister of Climate Resilience, Environment and Renewable Energy.
 Phillip Alfred Telesford – Minister of Social and Community Development, Housing and Gender Affairs
 Andy Williams – Minister of Mobilisation, Implementation and Transformation
 Lennox John Andrews – Minister of Economic Development,  Agriculture, Planning, Blue Economy, Creative Economy, Tourism and ICT
 Senator David Evlyn Andrews – Minister of Education, Youth and Sports Affairs
 Gayton Jonathan LaCrette – Minister of Health, Wellness and Religious Affairs
 Senator Gloria Ann Thomas – Minister of State in the Ministry of Social Affairs, Housing and Gender Affairs
 Ron Livingston Redhead- Minister of State in the Ministry of Education, Youth Affairs and Sports
 Senator Adrian Augustine Thomas – Minister of State in the Ministry of Agriculture, Fisheries and Cooperatives.

References 

Politics of Grenada
Grenada